Pick a Card, also known as Afula Express, is a 1997 Israeli romantic comedy drama film directed by Julie Shles. It stars Zvika Hadar, Esti Zakheim, and Aryeh Moskona. Critically acclaimed, it won the Ophir Award for Best Film. The film was selected as the Israeli entry for the Best Foreign Language Film at the 70th Academy Awards, but was not accepted as a nominee.

The movie focuses on aspiring magician David, whose girlfriend Batya wants him to concentrate more on their relationship.  David joins up with Romanian immigrant Shimon, hoping that the two of them can form a magic act.

See also
 List of submissions to the 70th Academy Awards for Best Foreign Language Film
 List of Israeli submissions for the Academy Award for Best Foreign Language Film

References

External links 
 

1997 films
Israeli comedy-drama films
1997 romantic comedy-drama films